Mary Esther Were is a Kenyan beauty pageant titleholder who was crowned as Miss Universe Kenya in 2016. She represented Kenya in the Miss Universe 2016 held in Manila, Philippines and placed as Top 6 finalist in the pageant, making it the highest placement of Kenya in the history of the pageant.

Biography 
Were's mother died when she was four and her father later died from complications of diabetes.  She won Miss Universe Kenya 2016 in Nairobi. She participated in Miss Universe 2016 in Manila, at the age of 27. She became the first ever delegate from Kenya to advance past the first round, finishing in the Top 6. She has written a novel and she hopes to get published soon and is a Marketing Administrator for CNBC Africa and Forbes Africa. She would like advocate for HIV awareness, drug addiction and affordable rehabilitation.

Miss Universe results

References

Kenyan beauty pageant winners
Miss Universe 2016 contestants
Living people
Year of birth missing (living people)